Kwabena Adu Kyei is a Ghanaian politician and member of the first parliament of the second republic of Ghana representing the Amansie East Constituency under the membership of the Progress Party.

Early life and education 
Kwabena was born on 27 November 1933 in the Ashanti region of Ghana. He attended Achimota School, Accra formerly Prince of Wales College and School, Achimota and later Achimota College. He thereafter proceeded to Roosevelt University College now Roosevelt University, Chicago, Illinois where he obtained his Bachelor of Science degree in Business Biology.

Politics 
Kwabena began his political career in 1969 when he became the parliamentary candidate for the Progress Party (PP)  to represent Amansie-East constituency prior to the commencement of the 1969 Ghanaian parliamentary election. He assumed office as a member of the first parliament of the second republic of Ghana on 1 October 1969 after being pronounced winner at the 1969 Ghanaian parliamentary election. His tenure ended on 13 January 1972.

Personal life 
He is a Christian and businessman.

References 

Progress Party (Ghana) politicians
Alumni of Achimota School
Roosevelt University alumni
Ghanaian MPs 1969–1972
People from Ashanti Region
Living people
1933 births